Events from the year 1818 in Germany.

Incumbents

Kingdoms 
 Kingdom of Prussia
 Monarch – Frederick William III of Prussia (16 November 1797 – 7 June 1840)
 Kingdom of Bavaria
 Maximilian I (1 January 1806 – 13 October 1825)
 Kingdom of Saxony
 Frederick Augustus I (20 December 1806 – 5 May 1827)
 Kingdom of Hanover
 George III (25 October 1760 –29 January 1820)
 Kingdom of Württemberg
 William (30 October 1816 – 25 June 1864)

Grand Duchies 
 Grand Duke of Baden
Charles 10 June 1811 – 8 December 1818
 Louis I (8 December 1818 – 30 March 1830)
 Grand Duke of Hesse
 Louis I (14 August 1806 – 6 April 1830)
 Grand Duke of Mecklenburg-Schwerin
 Frederick Francis I– (24 April 1785 – 1 February 1837)
 Grand Duke of Mecklenburg-Strelitz
 George (6 November 1816 – 6 September 1860)
 Grand Duke of Oldenburg
 Wilhelm (6 July 1785 –2 July 1823 ) Due to mental illness, Wilhelm was duke in name only, with his cousin Peter, Prince-Bishop of Lübeck, acting as regent throughout his entire reign.
 Peter I (2 July 1823 - 21 May 1829)
 Grand Duke of Saxe-Weimar-Eisenach
 Charles Frederick (14 June 1828 - 8 July 1853)

Principalities 
 Schaumburg-Lippe
 George William (13 February 1787 - 1860)
 Schwarzburg-Rudolstadt
 Friedrich Günther (28 April 1807 - 28 June 1867)
 Schwarzburg-Sondershausen
 Günther Friedrich Karl I (14 October 1794 - 19 August 1835)
 Principality of Lippe
 Leopold II (5 November 1802 - 1 January 1851)
 Principality of Reuss-Greiz
 Heinrich XIX (29 January 1817 - 31 October 1836)
 Waldeck and Pyrmont
 George II (9 September 1813 - 15 May 1845)

Duchies 
 Duke of Anhalt-Dessau
 Leopold IV (9 August 1817 - 22 May 1871)
 Duke of Brunswick
 Charles II (16 June 1815 – 9 September 1830)
 Duke of Saxe-Altenburg
 Duke of Saxe-Hildburghausen (1780–1826)  - Frederick
 Duke of Saxe-Coburg and Gotha
 Ernest I (9 December 1806 – 12 November 1826)
 Duke of Saxe-Meiningen
 Bernhard II (24 December 1803–20 September 1866)
 Duke of Schleswig-Holstein-Sonderburg-Beck
 Frederick William (25 March 1816 – 6 July 1825)

Events 

 12 January - The Dandy horse (Laufmaschine bicycle) was invented by Karl Drais in Mannheim.
 The University of Hohenheim located in the south of Stuttgart, Germany is founded.
 The Städel, officially the Städelsches Kunstinstitut und Städtische Galerie,  an art museum in Frankfurt, is founded.
 Akademisches Kunstmuseum, an art museum in Bonn, is founded.

Births 
 8 April – August Wilhelm von Hofmann, German chemist (d. 1892)
 5 May – Karl Marx, German political philosopher, co-author of The Communist Manifesto (d. 1883)

 27 September – Adolph Wilhelm Hermann Kolbe, German chemist (d. 1884)
 18 December – Max Joseph von Pettenkofer, German chemist and hygienist (d. 1901)
 Francis Dutton, Germany-born Premier of South Australia (d. 1892)

Deaths 
 11 January – Johann David Wyss, Swiss children's author writing in German (born 1743) 15 February – Friedrich Ludwig, Fürst zu Hohenlohe-Ingelfingen, Prussian general (b. 1746)
 22 October – Joachim Heinrich Campe, German linguist and publisher (born 1746)
 5 November – Heinrich Füger, German portrait and historical painter (born 1751)

 17 November – Charlotte of Mecklenburg-Strelitz, queen of George III of the United Kingdom (b. 1744)

References 

Years of the 19th century in Germany

 
Germany
Germany